Anderson Mountain is a summit  east of Pilot Knob in Iron County, Missouri, in the United States.

Anderson Mountain has the name of the local Anderson family.

References

Mountains of Iron County, Missouri
Mountains of Missouri